The following is a list of transfers for 2015 Malaysian football.

Malaysia Super League
The 2015 Malaysia Super League (also known as Liga Super Malaysia 2015 in Malay'') is the 11th season of the highest Malaysian football league since its inception in 2004. Twelve teams participated in the league with Johor Darul Ta'zim F.C. as the defending champions.

LionsXII will not be permitted to have any foreign players as it is intended to remain as a development team for Singaporean players.

FAM allow four foreign players quota starts season 2015, and one must be from Asian countries.

ATM FA

Transfers in

Transfers out

Johor Darul Takzim

Transfers in

Transfers out

Kelantan FA

Transfers in

Transfers out

Pahang FA

Transfers in

Transfers out

Perak FA

Transfers in

Transfers out

Felda United

Transfers in

Transfers out

Sarawak FA

Transfer In

Transfers out

Selangor FA

Transfers in

Transfers out

Sime Darby FC

Transfers in

Transfers out

LionsXII

Transfers in

Transfers out

Terengganu FA

Transfers in

Transfers out

PDRM FA

Transfers in

Transfers out

Malaysia Premier League
The 2015 Malaysia Premier League is the eleventh season of the second division in the Malaysian football league since its establishment in 2004.

FAM allow four foreign players quota starts season 2015, and one must be from Asian countries.

Kuantan FA

Transfers in

Transfers out

Johor Darul Takzim II

Transfers in

Transfers out

Kedah FA

Transfer in

Transfers out

Negeri Sembilan FA

Transfers in

Transfers out

Kuala Lumpur FA

Transfers in

Transfers out

T-Team FC

Transfers in

Transfers out

Penang FA

Transfers in

Transfers out

PKNS FC

Transfers in

Transfers out

DRB-Hicom FC

Transfers in

Transfers out

Putrajaya SPA FC

Transfers in

Transfers out

Sabah FA

Transfers in

Transfers out

UiTM FC

Transfers in

Transfers out

Harimau Muda

Transfers in

Transfers out

Malaysia FAM League
The 2015 Malaysia FAM League (referred to as the FAM League) is the 63rd season of the FAM League since its establishment in 1952. The league is currently the third level football league in Malaysia.

Air Asia F.C.

Transfers in

Felcra F.C.

Transfers in

Hanelang F.C.

Transfers in

Transfers out

Harimau Muda C

Transfers in

Transfers out

Johor Darul Ta'zim III F.C.

Transfers in

Kedah Malays FA

Transfers in

Transfers out

Malacca United F.C.

Transfers in

Transfers out

Megah Murni F.C.

Transfers in

MISC-MIFA

Transfers in

Transfers out

MOF F.C.

Transfers in

Transfers out

PBAPP FC

Transfers in

Transfers out

Penjara Malaysia F.C.

Transfers in

Perlis FA

Transfers in

Transfers out

Real Mulia F.C.

Transfers in

Transfer out

Shahzan Muda F.C.

Transfers in

Transfers out

Sungai Ara F.C.

Transfers in

Transfers out

UKM F.C.

Transfers in

Transfers out

See also

 2015 Malaysia Super League
 2015 Malaysia Premier League
 2015 Malaysia FAM League
 2015 Malaysia FA Cup
 2015 Malaysia Cup
 2015 Malaysia President's Cup
 2015 Malaysia Youth League

References

2015
Tranfers
Malaysia